Dieterlen's brush-furred mouse, Mt Oku brush-furred mouse, or Mount Oku brush-furred rat (Lophuromys dieterleni) is a species of rodent in the family Muridae. It is endemic to Mount Oku, Cameroon. Its natural habitat is montane forest at elevations above .

References

Lophuromys
Rodents of Africa
Mammals of Cameroon
Endemic fauna of Cameroon
Mammals described in 1997
Taxonomy articles created by Polbot
Fauna of the Cameroonian Highlands forests